Coombe Wood, Frilsham is a  biological Site of Special Scientific Interest south of Frilsham in Berkshire. It is in the North Wessex Downs, which is an Area of Outstanding Natural Beauty.

The woods are broadleaved, mixed and yew, located in a lowland area. The woodlands was first recorded in 1640.

Fauna

The site has the following animals

Invertebrates

Limenitis camilla
Dark green fritillary

Flora

The site has the following Flora:

Trees

Fraxinus
Quercus petraea
Quercus robur
Hazel

Plants

Hyacinthoides non-scripta
Mercurialis perennis
Luzula sylvatica
Carex pallescens
Carex strigosa
Dryopteris affinis
Solidago virgaurea
Lathyrus montanus
Lychnis flos-cuculi
Dactylorhiza fuchsii
Galium palustr
Mentha aquatica
Ranunculus flammula

References

Sites of Special Scientific Interest in Berkshire